Jama'at-e Rabbani is the Iranian branch of the Assemblies of God, one of the largest evangelical Pentecostal Christian churches. It has its centre in Tehran, Iran.

Many (about 80%) of its adherents are converts from Islam, the remainder are converts from Iranian Christian ethnic minorities. The services are conducted in Persian and Armenian.

Official Iranian perceptions 
The Iranian government, especially in its post-1979 Revolutionary Islamist form, is highly suspicious of all Christian religious groups, other than those native to Iran: namely, the Assyrian Church of the East and the Armenian Apostolic Church, both of which have been present in the lands of the Persian Empire since between the 1st and 4th centuries A.D.

During the late 17th and again in the 19th centuries, Iran was quite open to foreign influence, including Western Christian missionaries who founded schools, hospitals, and who proselytized Eastern Christians as well as Muslims.  These groups, among them French Jesuit Roman Catholics, British Anglicans, and American Assemblies of God had some small successes and the current presence in Iran of these denominations is due to their influence.  Conservatives consider these groups to be "western innovations" and are not fully trusted.  This sentiment is often shared even by the native Christian groups.

Since the Islamic Revolution, however, the institutionalization of Islamic Sharia law has come down especially hard on the Assemblies of God because of their unique success in converting Muslims to Christianity. This success is due principally to its principle of using the vernacular Persian language as the language of its prayer and not one of the several ancient languages (i.e., Syriac, Armenian) used for prayer by the other Christian groups.

Religious background 

Apostasy is considered the one unpardonable sin in Islam, so those who proselytize or otherwise encourage Muslims away from Islam may be put to death for blaspheming against Islam and Muhammad.

The persecution of Assemblies of God Christians in Iran today is not a series of isolated events or the result of individual prejudices but rather a state policy implemented at all levels in various forms. It affects both individuals as well as the church as a whole.

Controversy 
In the mid-1990s, Bishop Haik Hovsepian Mehr, head of the Iranian Assemblies of God, was ordered to comply with the following directives:
 No church service must be conducted in Persian language (the language of the people)
 All members must be issued with membership cards and their admittance to the services would be on production of the appropriate card.
 Photocopies of these cards and appropriate membership lists with their addresses to be given to the competent authorities.
 Sunday meetings were to be for members only. No meetings to be held on any other day, in particular Friday.
 No new members may be admitted without informing the appropriate department of the Ministry of Information and Islamic Guidance.

Reaction
The late bishop stated that "Never would he or his ministers bow down and comply with such inhumane and unjust demands" and that "our churches are open to all who want to come in."

Several churches have been forced to close by the Iranian regime. These include a building in Kerman and another in Ahwaz, both used by the Anglican and Presbyterian congregations in those cities; and the Assemblies of God Church in Gorgan. (This was the only evangelical church in the whole of Mazanderan province, and with its closure, there is nowhere for evangelical Christians to worship.) Various church house-groups have also been closed down in Sari and Mashad and Ahwaz and the Christians there are strictly forbidden to meet.

Despite guarantees of religious freedom for Christians in Article 13 of the Iranian constitution, it remains an offence to sell a copy of the Bible in Iran, which is practically impossible anyway, since the offices of the Iranian Bible Society were closed in 1980 and all its stocks confiscated by the State authorities. Despite all denials at the official level the Law on Apostasy is practised and remains in force. It is under this law that converts from Islam to other religions are subject to capital punishment.

In 1989, the Rev. Hossein Soodmand was executed for apostasy. Although born a Muslim, by 1989 Hossein had been a Christian for 25 years. He was an evangelist and the pastor of the Assemblies of God (AOG) Church in Mashad. Despite pleas for clemency by fellow pastors to the Dayro-E-Tasalamat (an Ombudsman and Muslim cleric-literally, "he who hears the cries of the oppressed"), Hossein was hanged on 3 December 1989 at the insistence of the Ombudsman. He left a blind wife and four children.

Mehdi Dibaj, a Muslim convert to Christianity, was imprisoned for nearly 9 years. During that time, he endured 2 years in solitary confinement and was subjected to mock executions. He was imprisoned by the Sharia court in Sari on three charges: that he had "insulted Islam, the prophet Muhammad and Ayatollah Khomeini" in a letter; that he was acting as a spy for the West; and that he was an apostate.

Iran's Supreme Court on two occasions dismissed the first charge on grounds that the letter was not proved to be in Hossein's handwriting and the second charge as unfounded. He continued to remain in prison solely on grounds of apostasy. In 1994, he was sentenced to death for apostasy and only after an international campaign for his release was he allowed out of prison on January 16 of that year.

Dibaj was abducted on Friday, June 24, 1994. His body was found in a west Tehran park on Tuesday, July 5, 1994.

Bishops
 1978 – 1994 Haik Hovsepian Mehr
 1994 – 2003 Edvard Hovsepian Mehr
 2003 – 2013 [[ Suren sarksian

References

Iran
Christian denominations in Iran
Pentecostal denominations in Asia